Arnold Herbert Johnson (November 15, 1921 – April 10, 2000) was an American actor who played the lead role in the film Putney Swope (1969); in the film, his voice was dubbed by Robert Downey, Sr., allegedly because Johnson could never remember his lines. Johnson appeared in Shaft (1971) as Cul, a friend of John Shaft and the owner of a shoeshine parlor. He also played a role in the film My Demon Lover (1987) and had roles in Rocky (1976) and Menace II Society (1993), as Thomas, the religious Christian grandfather of the lead character Caine (played by Tyrin Turner).

Examples of his television work include recurring roles as George "Hutch" Hutton in Sanford and Son and as Fletcher, Mother Winslow's second husband, on the sitcom Family Matters. He guest-starred as Uncle Buddy in a Christmas episode of The Jeffersons, titled "George Finds a Father". He also guest-starred as Hubert Johnson on Good Times in the episode titled "A Place to Die".

Johnson died in Los Angeles, California at the age of 78.

Filmography
Putney Swope (1969) as Putney
Shaft (1971) as Cul
Pipe Dreams (1976) as Johnny Monday
Rocky (1976) as Apollo's lawyer
A Hero Ain't Nothin' but a Sandwich (1978) as Patient
American Hot Wax (1978) as Arnold, Musician in Bar
On the Nickel (1980)
Honky Tonk Freeway (1981) as Bank Bum
Chu Chu and the Philly Flash (1981) as Bum
Racing with the Moon (1984) as Tattoo Artist
Oh, God! You Devil (1984) as Preacher
My Demon Lover (1987) as Fixer
Weeds (1987) as Inmate
The Seventh Sign (1988) as Janitor
Sunset (1988) as George
Piramiddo no kanata ni: White Lion densetsu (1989)
The Five Heartbeats (1991) as Mr. Matthews
Menace II Society (1993) as Thomas Lawson

References

External links

 
 

1921 births
2000 deaths
Male actors from New York City
People from Brooklyn
African-American male actors
American male film actors
American male television actors
20th-century American male actors
20th-century African-American people